Archizoom Associati was a design studio from Florence, Italy founded in 1966. The group that founded the studio consists of Andrea Branzi (architect and designer), Gilberto Corretti (architect and designer), Paolo Deganello (architect and designer) and Massimo Morozzi (architect and designer); later in 1968 the group was joined by Dario Bartolini (designer) and Lucia Bartolini (designer).

Archizoom organized his first exhibition called "Superarchitettura" in December 1966 along with the group Superstudio. The exhibition featured colorful projections and prototypes handled the concept of radical anti-design as dynamic sofa Superonda (conception by Andrea Branzi) produced by the company Poltronova. During 1967 Archizoom still Remained in the exhibitions as "Super Architettura 2" and "Modena" that brought the concept of kitsch dorms titled "dream beds".

The next few years until its dissolution in 1974, the group was in projects of modernist vision as the theoretical diffuse metropolis "No-Stop City" which featured the formulation of flexible interior products and places that are directed to a practice polychronic environment and constant construction activities in the city itself; idea behind the idealization of the breakdown of the traditional hermetic architecture in functions that trivialize and expand.

Style and History 

The team produced a rich series of projects in design, architecture and large scale urban visions, a work which is still a fundamental source of inspiration for generations to come.
 
Together with Superstudio, Archizoom invented "Superarchitecture", endorsing creative processes along the lines of Pop in architectural and design development, exemplified by objects such as the "Superonda"-sofa, (still made by poltronova) which invites unconventional postures by its waved shape.
 
The Dream Beds and Gazebos are results of "Superarchitecture" transformed into a productive system, which by the creation of eclectic objects and kitsch, undertakes the critical destruction of functionalist heritage and the spatial concept of the modern movement.

References

 Media art net
 Archizoom Exhibition at EPFL, Switzerland

Architecture firms of Italy
20th-century Italian architects
Modernist architects